Mid-Continent Public Library, officially known as Consolidated Library District #3,  is a consolidated public library system serving Clay, Platte, and Jackson Counties in Missouri, with headquarters in Independence, Missouri.

Mid-Continent Public Library is the largest public library system in the U.S. state of Missouri by number of volumes and size of budget. Its collection ranks among the 100 largest libraries in America, which includes university, public, and private collections, and is among the nation's 20 largest public library systems. (Note: The Kansas City Public Library is a separate library system with facilities primarily serving Kansas City in Jackson County, Missouri.)

On May 8, 2014, the Mid-Continent Public Library received the National Medal for Museum and Library Service during a ceremony at the White House in Washington D.C. The medal is the country's highest honor awarded by the Institute of Museum and Library Services.

History
The Independence Public Library was formed by the Independence Library Association in 1892 and the creation of the Citizens Improvement Association Library (later the Carnegie Library) in Excelsior Springs, Missouri in the 1890s.

After World War II, Clay, Platte, and Jackson counties each formed library systems. They began collaborating in the early 1960s, and on November 10, 1965, Clay and Jackson formed the Mid-Continent Public Library Service as a joint administrative body, though each library retained separate governing boards and budgets.

Even though they remained separate, their combined resources allowed them to merge administrative costs. Gaining the name Mid-Continent Public Library in 1968, the library system was well on its way to achieving its goal. Separating library services from school districts enabled them to expand library services to rural areas, which presently did not have services.

Platte County joined the group in 1968. In 1978, seven years after the state legislature passed a law allowing for consolidated multi-county library systems, the Clay and Jackson libraries officially merged to form Consolidated Library District No. 3. Platte County joined a year later.

Librarian James A. Leathers was influential in the creation of a regional library system and became the first Director of Mid-Continent Public Library Service. The library system is overseen by a Library Board of twelve members, four appointed by County Commissioners in each of the service region's three counties. It currently has 31 branches in the Kansas City Metropolitan Area of Missouri located in Kansas City, Independence, Liberty, Gladstone, Lee's Summit, Grandview, Blue Springs, Grain Valley, and other cities. It also hosts two installations at community centers in partnership with the Kansas City Parks and Recreation Department that provide automated library services and public Internet access.

In fiscal 2008-2009, the collection held 3,544,072 items. Total annual circulation was 9,183,005 items, and it filled 1,773,586 intra- and interlibrary loans. Branch libraries served 4,673,737 visitors. Total attendance at live programming events for adults and families and for children was 318,639 patrons. The system has 466,344 registered borrowers.

Annual circulation for the year exceeded one-half million items for each of the Mid-Continent Library's five busiest branches: Liberty, Lee's Summit, Colbern Road, North Independence, and Blue Springs South.

The system has one of the nation's largest Summer Reading Programs, which was completed by 106,846 patrons in fiscal 2009.

Midwest Genealogy Center

On June 21, 2008, Mid-Continent Public Library inaugurated the Midwest Genealogy Center in Independence, Missouri.  It is the largest stand-alone public genealogy research facility in America.

The  building houses a unique collection of records in almost completely open stacks. It holds 80,000 family history books, 100,000 local history items, 565,000 rolls of microfilm, and 7,000 maps. It also contains all available U.S. federal population census records and federal indexes, Civil War histories, immigration and naturalization records, ship passenger lists, Native American records, biographical archives, manuscripts pertaining to the American slave trade and the Antebellum South, Papers of the St. Louis Fur Trade, and a large variety of state records for Missouri and other states such as state censuses, tax records, penitentiary records, military service records, compiled records of Missouri Union and Confederate Army soldiers, approximately 50 Missouri newspapers, local newspaper indexes to obituaries and weddings, and genealogical periodicals.  The center also has 10,000 volumes available for circulation in the “Genealogy from the Heartland Collection” created from donations by the American Family Records Association (AFRA), Missouri State Genealogical Association (MoSGA), Heart of America Genealogical Society (HAGS), Gann Family Association, and patron contributions.

References

External links
 
 Libraries.org | https://librarytechnology.org/library/20137

Public libraries in Missouri
Genealogical libraries in the United States
Kansas City metropolitan area
Education in Jackson County, Missouri
Education in Platte County, Missouri
Education in Clay County, Missouri
Libraries established in 1965
Buildings and structures in Jackson County, Missouri
Buildings and structures in Platte County, Missouri
Buildings and structures in Clay County, Missouri
1965 establishments in Missouri